Aubrey "Postman" Modiba (born 22 July 1995) is a South African soccer player who plays as a left-midfielder and left-back for Mamelodi Sundowns in the Premier Soccer League. He has played for the South Africa national under-20 soccer team  and currently represents the South Africa national team. He is a former Mpumalanga Black Aces player, where he played his first two Premier Soccer League seasons. He represented South Africa in the soccer competition at the 2016 Summer Olympics.

Club career
Modiba began his professional soccer career at 19 years old representing Mpumalanga Black Aces in the 2014–15 PSL season. He managed only 1 appearance in his opening season, but grew to strength quickly earning himself 25 appearances in only his second season. In 2016, he was signed by Cape Town City after the relocation of Aces.

International career
Modiba currently plays for the South Africa national U23 team as a midfielder. He has earned 6 caps at the U23 level and 17 with the U20 team.

Career statistics

International
As of match played on 8 June 2018.

International goals
As of match played on 8 June 2018. South Africa score listed first, score column indicates score after each Modiba goal.

Olympics
In 2016, Modiba was selected to represent South Africa at the 2016 Summer Olympics in Rio de Janeiro. He featured in every one of the team's three games, starting in midfield for two out of three.

References

External links

1995 births
Living people
People from Polokwane
Sportspeople from Limpopo
South African soccer players
Association football midfielders
Association football defenders
South African Premier Division players
Mpumalanga Black Aces F.C. players
Cape Town City F.C. (2016) players
SuperSport United F.C. players
Mamelodi Sundowns F.C. players
South Africa international soccer players
Footballers at the 2016 Summer Olympics
Olympic soccer players of South Africa